Graham Creek may refer to:

Graham Creek (Alberta), a stream in Saskatchewan and Alberta
Graham Creek (Sonoma County, California), a stream in California
Graham Creek (Rogue River tributary), a stream in Oregon
Graham Creek (Manitoba), a river in Saskatchewan and Manitoba
Grahams Creek, Queensland, a rural locality in the Fraser Coast Region, Queensland, Australia